Abd al-Rahman ibn Rustam was the first Persian imam of the Imamate of Tiaret and the founder of Rustamid dynasty, which existed in central Maghreb from about 776 or 778 CE to 908 CE. He was also the founder of the new Tiaret.

Life
Abd al-Rahman was probably born  in Iraq. His father, Rustam, a Persian man, left Iraq with his son and wife to join the Maghreb, but died when he arrived in Mecca or its surroundings. His mother had remarried a Kairouani pilgrim she had met in Mecca and the couple raised Al-Rahman at Kairouan.

Abd Al-Rahman was a quick and energetic learner, and had studied under Abu Ubaida Muslim in Basra. Abd Al-Rahman became one of the five missionaries who was ultimately responsible for the spread of the Ibadite doctrine in the Maghreb.

The first Imam of the Ibadites had captured Kairawan from the Warfadjuma warriors and after his conquest, he gave several parts of Ifrikiya to Abd al-Rahman (unfortunately, in June 758- the same year- Ibn al-Asha'ath retook Kairawan). Ibn al-Ash'ath was after him though.

Quickly though, Abd Al-Rahman and his son Abd al-Wahhab and their companions took refuge in the central Maghrib and ended up founding the town of Tahert, which is now known as Tagdemt near Kuzul.  The city was quickly populated with Ibadite emigrants from Ifrikiya and  theDjebel Nefusa.

At about 776 or 778 CE, Abd Al-Rahman became the Imamof the Ibadites of Tahert. He seems to have had a very peaceful reign and worked hard to ensure that justice and simplicity were also instilled in Tahert's legal system. The eastern Abadite communities held high respect for him and sent him a number of money and presents, in addition to recognizing his right to an Imamate. He is alleged to have died at about 784 CE and his son Abd Al-Wahhab  succeeded him.

References

Year of birth missing
784 deaths
Ibadi Muslims
8th-century Islamic religious leaders
Slave owners